Plaesiorrhina watkinsiana is a beetle belonging to the family Scarabaeidae.

Description
The basic colour is dark green, with a transversal orange band on the elytra.

Distribution
This species can be found in the Western and Central Afrotropical region (mainly in Cameroon and Democratic Republic of Congo.

References

watkinsiana
Beetles described in 1879